The Battle of Cutanda or Batalla de Cutanda was a battle in June of the year 1120 between the forces of Alfonso I the Battler and an army led by Almoravid general Ibrahim ibn Yusuf occurring in a place called Cutanda, near Calamocha (Teruel), in which the Almoravid army was defeated by the combined forces, mainly of Aragon and Navarre.

Alfonso I was aided by William IX, Duke of Aquitaine who dispatched French troops to aid the Christian forces in the battle. The Almoravid Emir, Ali ibn Yusuf sent his general Ibrahim ibn Yusuf to intercept the Christian forces near Calamocha. The Muslim and Christian armies met at a place known as Cutanda where the battle ensued. The Almoravid army was destroyed and their general, Ibrahim, killed. After this battle the Aragonese captured the fortified towns of Calatayud and Daroca.

References 
Cañada Juste, Alberto, La batalla de Cutanda (1120), 1997; Xiloca nº 20 
Tucoo-Chala, Pierre,  Quand l'Islam était aux portes des Pyrénées, 1994; Biarritz: J&D Editions 

Battles involving Aragon
12th century in Aragon
Cutanda 1120
Conflicts in 1120
1120 in Europe
Cutanda
12th century in Al-Andalus